Events from the year 1684 in the Kingdom of Scotland.

Incumbents

 Monarch – Charles II

Judiciary 
 Lord President of the Court of Session – Sir David Falconer
 Lord Justice General – James Drummond, 4th Earl of Perth, George Livingston, 3rd Earl of Linlithgow, from 10 July
 Lord Justice Clerk – Sir Richard Maitland, Sir James Foulis, 2nd Baronet, from 22 February

Events 
 25 June – Death of Robert Leighton, Archbishop of Glasgow, gives rise to establishment of the Leighton Library at Dunblane, the oldest surviving public subscription (lending) library in Scotland.
 3 November – In the Peerage of Scotland
 The Marquess of Huntly is elevated to the title George Gordon, 1st Duke of Gordon.
 The Marquess of Queensbury is elevated to the title William Douglas, 1st Duke of Queensberry.
 24 December – The Killing Time: Covenanter Robert Baillie of Jerviswood is hanged for treason at the Mercat Cross in Edinburgh, having been implicated as a conspirator in the Rye House Plot of 1683 to kill the king.
 George Gordon, 1st Earl of Aberdeen, is dismissed as Lord Chancellor of Scotland and succeeded by James Drummond, 4th Earl of Perth.

Births
 6 May – John Murray, Marquess of Tullibardine, soldier (killed in action 1709 at Battle of Malplaquet)
 Alexander Dunlop, Professor of Greek in the University of Glasgow (died 1747)
 Alexander Smith, Roman Catholic bishop, Vicar Apostolic of the Lowland District (died 1766)
 Probable date – Patrick Campbell, lieutenant-general, politician and courtier (died 1751)

Deaths
 25 June – Robert Leighton, Archbishop of Glasgow and scholar (born 1611 in England)
 20 November (bur.) – Sir John Cunningham, 1st Baronet, politician
 December – Sir Alexander Abercromby, 1st Baronet, politician (born c.1603)
 24 December – Baillie of Jerviswood, Covenanter (born c.1634)

See also

Timeline of Scottish history

References

 
Years of the 17th century in Scotland